Yan Vyshatich (Ян Вышатич in Russian) (c. 1016 – June 24, 1106) was a Rus' nobleman and military commander (tysyatsky). The last known representative of the Dobrynya dynasty, Yan Vyshatich was the son of Vyshata and grandson of Ostromir.

Historical clues about Yan's career are scarce. In the 1070s, Yan Vyshatich collected tribute for Sviatoslav II near Beloozero and suppressed an uprising of smerds there. He took part in military campaigns against the Polovtsy and internecine wars. Yan Vyshatich's tales of his and his ancestors' campaigns were Nestor's major source in compiling the Russian Primary Chronicle.

Sources

Kievan Rus' people
1010s births
1106 deaths
Russian knights